Usmanpura is an affluent suburban locality on the banks of the Sabarmati River in Ahmedabad, Gujarat, India. The name is take from Syed Usman, whose tomb located next to Usmanpura garden. Usmanpura houses Darpan Academy, run by Mallika Sarabhai, an exponent of classical dancing in India. It is also known for premier hotels, such as Fortune Landmark, Hyatt Regency, Holiday Inn Express, and Regenta. The boundaries of the suburb also touch Gujarat Vidyapith, a major university founded by Mahatma Gandhi, the father of Indian independence. Within Usmanpura an area named Shantinagar exists where 80% of people follow Jainism.

Neighbourhoods in Ahmedabad